Palais Renaissance, or Palais (pronounced pa-lay)  is a mall located at the shopping district of Orchard Road, Singapore.

Located beside the Royal Thai Embassy, Palais Renaissance comprises a 13-storey office block coupled with 4 storeys of retail space.

Palais Renaissance is owned and managed by property developer City Developments Limited.

Awards 
2014

Best Service Award – Top 3

Her World Nuyou Mall Awards

2018

Green Mark Platinum Award (Recertified)

Building and Construction Authority (BCA)

See also

 List of shopping malls in Singapore

References

External links
 
 City Developments Limited Official Website

Shopping malls in Singapore
City Developments Limited
Orchard, Singapore
Orchard Road
1993 establishments in Singapore